The Brillouin and Langevin functions are a pair of special functions that appear when studying an idealized paramagnetic material in statistical mechanics. These functions are named after French physicists Paul Langevin and Léon Brillouin who contributed to the microscopic understanding of magnetic properties of matter.

Brillouin function  

The Brillouin function is a special function defined by the following equation:

The function is best known for arising in the calculation of the magnetization of an ideal paramagnet. In particular, it describes the dependency of the magnetization  on the applied magnetic field  and the total angular momentum quantum number J of the microscopic magnetic moments of the material. The magnetization is given by:

where
 is the number of atoms per unit volume,
 the g-factor,
 the Bohr magneton,
 is the ratio of the Zeeman energy of the magnetic moment in the external field  to the thermal energy :

 is the Boltzmann constant and  the temperature.

{| class="toccolours collapsible collapsed" width="80%" style="text-align:left"
!Click "show" to see a derivation of this law:
|-
|A derivation of this law describing the magnetization of an ideal paramagnet is as follows. Let z be the direction of the magnetic field. The z-component of the angular momentum of each magnetic moment (a.k.a. the azimuthal quantum number) can take on one of the 2J+1 possible values -J,-J+1,...,+J. Each of these has a different energy, due to the external field B: The energy associated with quantum number m is

(where g is the g-factor, μB is the Bohr magneton, and x is as defined in the text above). The relative probability of each of these is given by the Boltzmann factor:

where Z (the partition function) is a normalization constant such that the probabilities sum to unity. Calculating Z, the result is:
.
All told, the expectation value of the azimuthal quantum number m is
.
The denominator is a geometric series and the numerator is a type of arithmetico–geometric series, so the series can be explicitly summed. After some algebra, the result turns out to be

With N magnetic moments per unit volume, the magnetization density is
.
|}

Takacs proposed the following approximation to the inverse of the Brillouin function:

Langevin function  

In the classical limit, the moments can be continuously aligned in the field and  can assume all values. The Brillouin function is then simplified into the Langevin function, named after Paul Langevin:

An alternative, better behaved approximation can be derived from the
Lambert's continued fraction expansion of :

For small enough , both approximations are numerically better than a direct evaluation of the actual analytical expression, since the latter suffers from catastrophic cancellation for  where .

The inverse Langevin function  is defined on the open interval (−1, 1).

and by the Padé approximant

One popular approximation, valid on the whole range (−1, 1), has been published by A. Cohen:

Greater accuracy can be achieved by using the formula given by R. Jedynak:

The maximal relative error for this approximation is 1.5% at the vicinity of x = 0.85. Even greater accuracy can be achieved by using the formula given by M. Kröger:

The maximal relative error for this approximation is less than 0.28%. More accurate approximation was reported by R. Petrosyan:

The maximal relative error for the above formula is less than 0.18%.

New approximation given by R. Jedynak, is the best reported approximant at complexity 11:

Its maximum relative error is less than 0.076%.

Current state-of-the-art diagram of the approximants to the inverse Langevin function 
presents the figure below. It is valid for the rational/Padé approximants,

A recently published paper by R. Jedynak, provides a series of the optimal approximants to the inverse Langevin function. The table below reports the results with correct asymptotic behaviors,.

Comparison of relative errors for the different optimal rational approximations, which were computed with constraints (Appendix 8 Table 1)

 
Also recently, an efficient near-machine precision approximant, based on spline interpolations, has been proposed by Benítez and Montáns, where Matlab code is also given to generate the spline-based approximant and to compare many of the previously proposed approximants in all the function domain.

High-temperature limit  

When  i.e. when  is small, the expression of the magnetization can be approximated by the Curie's law:

where  is a constant. One can note that  is the effective number of Bohr magnetons.

High-field limit  

When , the Brillouin function goes to 1. The magnetization saturates with the magnetic moments completely aligned with the applied field:

References 

Magnetism